Alys Dayana Cruz Cordonero (born 24 February 1998) is a Nicaraguan footballer who plays as a defender for the Nicaragua women's national team.

International career
Cruz capped for Nicaragua at senior level during two Central American and Caribbean Games editions (2014 and 2018), the 2018 CONCACAF Women's Championship qualification and the 2020 CONCACAF Women's Olympic Qualifying Championship qualification.

References 

1998 births
Living people
Nicaraguan women's footballers
Women's association football defenders
Nicaragua women's international footballers